Jack Thomas Stobbs (born 27 February 1997) is an English footballer who plays as a winger for  club Torquay United, on loan from  club Oldham Athletic.

He turned professional at Sheffield Wednesday in March 2014 and made his first team debut the following month. He joined Port Vale on loan for the first half of the 2017–18 season and started the 2019–20 season on loan at Scottish club Livingston. After being released by Wednesday he signed with Grantham Town in October 2020, before returning to the English Football League with Oldham Athletic in August 2021, though Oldham were relegated into non-League at the end of the 2021–22 season. He joined Torquay United on loan in March 2023.

Career

Sheffield Wednesday
Stobbs joined the Academy at Sheffield Wednesday at the age of eight, and signed his first professional contract with the club in March 2014. He made his senior team debut on 26 April, coming on for Joe Mattock 60 minutes into a 3–1 defeat to Bolton Wanderers at Hillsborough, in what was the final home game of the 2013–14 season. However he suffered ankle ligament damage in a friendly at Matlock Town in the 2014–15 pre-season, which left him having to regain his fitness in order to try and force his way into manager Stuart Gray's first team plans. He had to wait until the last day of the 2015–16 season to make his second appearance for the "Owls", when he came on as a 79th-minute substitute for Atdhe Nuhiu in a 2–1 loss at Wolverhampton Wanderers on 7 May 2016. He signed a new one-year contract in June 2017 after captaining the U23 team to the Professional Development League 2 North title and National Championship in 2016–17.

On 17 August 2017, Stobbs joined newly relegated EFL League Two club Port Vale on loan for the 2017–18 season; manager Michael Brown said that "[chief scout] Darren Wrack has worked very hard on it and he is a good, exciting, young player". However he struggled to even appear on the first-team bench, and speaking in October, new manager Neil Aspin blamed league rules that prevented him from naming more than five loanees in a matchday squad. He was recalled by Wednesday on 2 January 2018. New Wednesday manager Jos Luhukay put him into the first-team and gave him a new -year contract. He featured in one EFL Cup game in the 2018–19 season.

On 20 August 2019, he joined Scottish Premiership side Livingston on loan until 1 January. He scored on his "Lions" debut, his first in professional football, in a 4–1 victory at Ross County on 24 August. The strike was later named as the best goal in Scottish football of the 2019–20 season by the Glasgow Times. However injury restricted him to just further three appearances in the remainder of his spell at the Almondvale Stadium and he was released by Wednesday at the end of the 2019–20 campaign; he was informed of his release via Zoom due to the COVID-19 pandemic in England. Stobbs said that he was upset at being released after 17 years in such circumstances but understood it was necessary due to the government's pandemic regulations; he went on to comment that "He (Garry Monk) had not seen me play and I had not trained with them due to being up there (Livingston), so he didn't really know anything about me. I had hoped to come back and be involved more than I was but it didn't work out like that.

Grantham Town
On 15 October 2020, Stobbs joined Northern Premier League Premier Division club Grantham Town. He played six games before the 2020–21 season was curtailed early due to the ongoing pandemic.

Oldham Athletic
On 4 August 2021, Stobbs joined League Two side Oldham Athletic on a one-year contract following a lengthy trial period; "Latics" boss Keith Curle said that "he is one of the most committed players I have ever come across". He played 33 times during the 2021–22 campaign that saw the club relegated out of the English Football League after 115 years and was one of only two players to be offered a new contract by manager John Sheridan. This new deal was accepted by Stobbs and signed in June 2022.

On 14 March 2023, Stobbs joined fellow National League side Torquay United on loan until the end of the 2022–23 season; he had impressed manager Gary Johnson in a game against Torquay earlier in the season.

Style of play
Speaking in August 2014, Sheffield Wednesday manager Stuart Gray said that Stobbs is "one of those who runs at defenders in one-versus-one situations and he's got a great habit of putting the ball between the posts for someone to score". Stobbs himself stated that "I've got a bit of pace and I like to take people on, I like to get to the byline, get crosses into the box and, where I can, I try to get a few goals".

Career statistics

References

External links

1997 births
Living people
Footballers from Leeds
English footballers
Association football wingers
Sheffield Wednesday F.C. players
Port Vale F.C. players
Livingston F.C. players
Grantham Town F.C. players
Oldham Athletic A.F.C. players
Torquay United F.C. players
English Football League players
Scottish Professional Football League players
Northern Premier League players
National League (English football) players